Labocephalus is a genus of beetles in the family Carabidae, containing the following species:

 Labocephalus longipennis (Laporte de Castelnau, 1835)
 Labocephalus occipitalis Jeannel, 1949
 Labocephalus platysomus Alluaud, 1918
 Labocephalus striatus (Guerin-Meneville, 1832)

References

Lebiinae